Kinsale was a constituency represented in the Irish House of Commons until 1800.

History
In the Patriot Parliament of 1689 summoned by James II, Kinsale was represented by two members.

Members of Parliament, 1559–1801
1559, Jan. 
Sir John Alan, knight, former Lord Chancellor of Ireland, of Alencourt and St.Wolstan's, Kildare. 
Francis Agar or Agard, Esq., of Grangegorman, Dublin, and of Fawston, Staffordshire.
1585, April. 
James Galwey, Esq., of Kinsale. 
Philip Roche, Esq., of Kinsale.
1613-1615
 James Roche Fitz-Philip
 Dominick Roche Fitz-Richard
1634-1635
 William Gallwey
 James Roche
1639-1641
 Patrick Roche Fitz-Richard
 Philip Roche Fitz-Richard
1661-1666
 St. John Broderick
 Randolph Clayton

1689–1801

Notes

References

Bibliography

Johnston-Liik, E. M. (2002). History of the Irish Parliament, 1692–1800., Publisher: Ulster Historical Foundation (28 Feb 2002),  
Tim Cadogan and Jeremiah Falvey, A Biographical Dictionary of Cork, 2006, Four Courts Press 

Constituencies of the Parliament of Ireland (pre-1801)
Historic constituencies in County Cork
Kinsale
1334 establishments in Ireland
1800 disestablishments in Ireland
Constituencies established in 1334
Constituencies disestablished in 1800